Jüri Ottas (also Georg Ottas; 14 October 1885 Vana-Kuuste Parish, Tartu County – 13 April 1942 Kirov Oblast, Russia) was an Estonian politician. He was a member of III Riigikogu.

References

1885 births
1942 deaths
Members of the Riigikogu, 1926–1929
Members of the Estonian National Assembly
Members of the Riigikogu, 1929–1932
Members of the Riigikogu, 1932–1934
Farmers' Assemblies politicians
Estonian people who died in Soviet detention
People who died in the Gulag
People from Kambja Parish